The Chapter of the Holy Sepulchre, also named the Church of the Holy Sepulchre, was a church in Paris, France.

Location
The church was located at 60 Rue Saint-Denis. Just before the Revolution, the building was in an exclave of the Saint-Merri parish.

History
The church and the hospital belonged to the Canons Regular of the Holy Sepulchre. They were built in 1326 to host the pilgrims who went through Paris on their way to or back from the Church of the Holy Sepulchre in Jerusalem.

The Canons Regular of the Holy Sepulchre were suppressed in 1790.

In 1791, a company of Dutch or Batavian merchants acquired the buildings. They had the buildings demolished and built a large trade house, the cour batave ("Batavian courtyard"), on the site. The house was designed by architects Jean-Nicolas Sobre and Célestin-Joseph Happe.

References

External links

 Drawing of the church, gallica.bnf.fr 

Roman Catholic churches in the 4th arrondissement of Paris
Former Roman Catholic church buildings
Destroyed churches in France
Former buildings and structures in Paris
Buildings and structures demolished in the 19th century
19th-century disestablishments in France
Demolished buildings and structures in Paris
14th-century Roman Catholic church buildings in France